Utkir Kurbanov (born 3 February 1983) is an Uzbekistani judoka. He and Askhat Zhitkeyev of Kazakhstan shared the bronze medal at the -100 kg category of the 2006 Asian Games.

References

External links
 
 

Uzbekistani male judoka
1983 births
Living people
Olympic judoka of Uzbekistan
Judoka at the 2008 Summer Olympics
Place of birth missing (living people)
Asian Games medalists in judo
Judoka at the 2006 Asian Games
Judoka at the 2010 Asian Games
Asian Games bronze medalists for Uzbekistan
Medalists at the 2006 Asian Games
Medalists at the 2010 Asian Games
21st-century Uzbekistani people